The twelfth season of The Real Housewives of Atlanta, an American reality television series, is broadcast on Bravo and it premiered on November 3, 2019, and is primarily filmed in Atlanta, Georgia. Its executive producers are Steven Weinstock, Glenda Hersh, Lauren Eskelin, Lorraine Haughton-Lawson, Luke Neslage, Glenda Cox, Joye Chin, and Andy Cohen.

The Real Housewives of Atlanta focuses on the lives of NeNe Leakes, Kandi Burruss, Cynthia Bailey, Kenya Moore, Porsha Williams and Eva Marcille.

This season marked the final appearance of NeNe Leakes, and the final regular appearance of Eva Marcille.

Cast
For the twelfth season, all the cast from the previous season, with the exception of Shamari DeVoe, returned to the series, with Kenya Moore returning to the show after a one-season absence. Marlo Hampton and Tanya Sam appeared again as friends of the cast. In addition to this, Yovanna Momplasir and Shamea Morton made multiple guest appearances throughout the season

Production 
The season's reunion special was scheduled to be filmed on March 19, 2020. However, in the midst of the COVID-19 pandemic, Andy Cohen confirmed the reunion filming was postponed to a later date. The reunion was filmed virtually on April 23, 2020, marking the first time a Bravo show has filmed a reunion show using remote production techniques.

Episodes

References

External links
 

 

2019 American television seasons
2020 American television seasons
Atlanta (season 12)